Yeongheung Island is an island in the Yellow Sea, within the municipal borders of Incheon metropolitan city.  It has a population of roughly 4000 people and an area of 23.46 km².  The island is connected by road to neighbouring Seonjae-do (Hangeul:선재도) (and thus to Daebu Island and the mainland) by the 1.25 km-long Yeongheung Bridge, which opened in December 2001.  Administratively, the island today is divided into ten li: Nae-ri (내리) 1 to 7, and Oi-ri (외리) 1 to 3.  Employment is provided through tourism, fishing, and the thermoelectric power station, largely built on reclaimed land on the south-west coast of the island.

History
During the Joseon Dynasty and up to 1914, Yeongheung Island was included in the old jurisdiction of Namyang County.  In 1914 it was transferred to Bucheon, and in 1973 to Ongjin County, which became part of Incheon metropolitan city in 1995.

Yeongheung Island is featured strongly in the first-hand account The Secrets of Inchon: The Untold Story of the Most Daring Covert Mission of the Korean War.  According to The Secrets of Inchon, Yeongheung Island was used for a reconnaissance/commando mission led by Commander Eugene F. Clark to surveil the regions along the Flying Fish Channel, including Wolmi Island, Daebu Island and Muuido, among others.  This expedition preceded and allowed for the successful Battle of Incheon.

Attractions
Yeongheung Island has several sandy beaches, most notably Nae-ri (내리) on the east coast, Simripo (십리포) in the north-east, along the edge of which lies a grove of Carpinus coreana, and Janggyeong-ri (장경리) in the north-west.

See also
Islands of South Korea
Geography of South Korea

References

External links
Youngheungdo.com

Islands of Gyeonggi Province
Islands of the Yellow Sea